Jacqueville Department or simply Jacqueville, is a department of Grands-Ponts Region, Lagunes District, Ivory Coast. In 2021, its population was 80,593, and its seat is the settlement of Jacqueville. The sub-prefectures of the department are Attoutou and Jacqueville.

History
Jacqueville Department was created in 1998 as a second-level subdivision via a split-off from Abidjan Department. At its creation, it was part of Lagunes Region.

In 2011, districts were introduced as new first-level subdivisions of Ivory Coast. At the same time, regions were reorganised and became second-level subdivisions and all departments were converted into third-level subdivisions. At this time, Jacqueville Department became part of Grands-Ponts Region in Lacs District.

Notes

Departments of Grands-Ponts
1998 establishments in Ivory Coast
States and territories established in 1998